The 1822 United States elections occurred in the middle of Democratic-Republican President James Monroe's second term, and was the last election of the First Party System. Members of the 18th United States Congress were chosen in this election. The 1820 census added 26 seats to the House. Democratic-Republicans continued to dominate both chambers of Congress.

See also
1822–23 United States House of Representatives elections
1822–23 United States Senate elections

References

1822 elections in the United States
1822
United States midterm elections